The Van Wagenen House, also known as Apple Tree House, is located near Bergen Square in Jersey City, Hudson County, New Jersey, United States. The house was added to the National Register of Historic Places on August 16, 2006.

History
The house was built in 1740. An addition was added in the 1820s. The house may have been the site of a meeting between George Washington and the Marquis de Lafayette in 1779. The name Apple Tree House is given to the home because of a former apple orchard and cider press that were located on the property. The house was purchased by the Quinn family and used as a funeral parlor for a number of years.

In 1996, the house was on Preservation New Jersey's 10 Most Endangered Historic Sites list. The city of Jersey City purchased the building in 1999 for $450,000 and has been working to improve the condition of the building. The New Jersey Historic Trust gave Jersey City a grant in 2006 for interior restoration and accessibility improvements. Jersey City plans to use the house as a museum. Interior renovations were completed in 2014.

An annual wreath-laying ceremony occurs at the house every President's Day that is hosted by the George Washington Society.

In 2021, the city announced its intentions to create the Jersey City Historical Museum at the building.

Gallery

See also
 Newkirk House
 Van Vorst House
 List of the oldest buildings in New Jersey
 National Register of Historic Places listings in Hudson County, New Jersey

References

External links

 The Van Wagenen Family Website
 Jersey City Past and Present
 View of Van Wagenen House via Google Street View
 

Houses in Hudson County, New Jersey
Houses on the National Register of Historic Places in New Jersey
History of Jersey City, New Jersey
Buildings and structures in Jersey City, New Jersey
Houses completed in 1740
Stone houses in New Jersey
National Register of Historic Places in Hudson County, New Jersey
New Jersey Register of Historic Places